Nguyễn Thọ Chân (20 August 1922 – 6 January 2023) was a Vietnamese politician. A member of the Communist Party, he served as Minister of Labor from 1974 to 1981.

Nguyễn died in Ho Chi Minh City on 6 January 2023, at the age of 100.

References

1922 births
2023 deaths
20th-century Vietnamese politicians
Communist Party of Vietnam politicians
Labour ministers of Vietnam
Men centenarians
People from Hanoi
Vietnamese centenarians